The 1836 United States presidential election was the 13th quadrennial presidential election, held from Thursday, November 3 to Wednesday, December 7, 1836. In the third consecutive election victory for the Democratic Party, incumbent Vice President Martin Van Buren defeated four candidates fielded by the nascent Whig Party.

The 1835 Democratic National Convention chose a ticket of Van Buren (President Andrew Jackson's handpicked successor) and U.S. Representative Richard Mentor Johnson of Kentucky. The Whig Party, which had only recently emerged and was primarily united by opposition to Jackson, was not yet sufficiently organized to agree on a single candidate. Hoping to compel a contingent election in the House of Representatives by denying the Democrats an electoral majority, the Whigs ran multiple candidates. Most Northern and border state Whigs supported the ticket led by former Senator William Henry Harrison of Ohio, while most Southern Whigs supported the ticket led by Senator Hugh Lawson White of Tennessee. Two other Whigs, Daniel Webster and Willie Person Mangum, carried Massachusetts and South Carolina respectively on single-state tickets.

Despite facing multiple candidates, Van Buren won a majority of the electoral vote, and he won a majority of the popular vote in both the North and the South. Nonetheless, the Whig strategy came very close to success, as Van Buren won the decisive state of Pennsylvania by just over two points. As Virginia's electors voted for Van Buren but refused to vote for Johnson, Johnson fell one vote short of an electoral majority, compelling a contingent election for vice president. In that contingent election, the United States Senate elected Johnson over Harrison's running mate, Francis Granger, on the first ballot.

Van Buren was the third incumbent vice president to win election as president, an event which would not happen again until 1988, when George H. W. Bush was elected president, 152 years later. Harrison finished second in both the popular and electoral vote, and his strong performance helped him win the Whig nomination in the 1840 presidential election. The election of 1836 was crucial in developing the Second Party System and a stable two-party system more generally. By the end of the election, nearly every independent faction had been absorbed by either the Democrats or the Whigs.

Nominations

Democratic Party nomination 

The 1835 Democratic National Convention was held in Baltimore, Maryland, from 20–22 May 1835. The early date of the convention was selected by President Andrew Jackson to prevent the formation of opposition to Martin Van Buren. Twenty-two states and two territories were represented at the convention with Alabama, Illinois, and South Carolina being unrepresented. The delegate amount per state varied from Maryland having 188 delegates to cast its ten votes while Tennessee's fifteen votes were cast by one delegate.

The convention saw the first credentials dispute in American history with two rival delegations from Pennsylvania claiming the state's votes. The issue was solved by seating both delegations and having them share the state's votes. An attempt to remove the two-thirds requirement for the selection of a candidate was passed by a vote of 231 to 210, but was later restored through a voice vote.

Some Southerners opposed Johnson's nomination, due to his open relationship with an enslaved woman, whom he had regarded as his common-law wife. At the convention, Van Buren was nominated unanimously with all 265 delegates in favor, but the Virginia delegates supported Senator William Cabell Rives against Johnson. However, Rives got little support and Johnson was nominated with one more vote than the two-thirds requirement.

Whig Party nomination 

The Whig Party emerged during the 1834 mid-term elections as the chief opposition to the Democratic Party. The party was formed from members of the National Republican Party, the Anti-Masonic Party, disaffected Jacksonians, and small remnants of the Federalist Party (people whose last political activity was with them a decade before). Some Southerners who were angered by Jackson's opposition to states' rights, including Sen. John C. Calhoun and the Nullifiers, also temporarily joined the Whig coalition.

Unlike the Democrats, the Whigs did not hold a national convention. Instead, state legislatures and state conventions nominated candidates, being the reason why so many candidates from the Whig party ran in the general election. Southern Nullifiers placed Tennessee Senator Hugh Lawson White into contention for the presidency in 1834 soon after his break with Jackson. White was a moderate on the states' rights issue, which made him acceptable in the South, but not in the North. The state legislatures of Alabama and Tennessee officially nominated White. The South Carolina state legislature nominated Senator Willie Person Mangum of North Carolina. By early 1835, Massachusetts Senator Daniel Webster was building support among Northern Whigs. Both Webster and White used Senate debates to establish their positions on the issues of the day, as newspapers carried the text of their speeches nationwide. The Pennsylvania legislature nominated popular former general William Henry Harrison, who had led American forces at the Battle of Tippecanoe. The Whigs hoped that Harrison's reputation as a military hero could win voter support. Harrison soon displaced Webster as the preferred candidate of Northern Whigs. State legislatures, particularly in larger states, also nominated various vice presidential candidates.

Despite multiple candidates, there was only one Whig ticket in each state. The Whigs ended up with two main tickets: William Henry Harrison for president and Francis Granger for vice president in the North and the border states, and Hugh Lawson White for president and John Tyler for vice president in the middle and lower South. In Massachusetts, the ticket was Daniel Webster for president and Granger for vice president. In South Carolina, the ticket was Mangum for president and Tyler for vice president. Of the four Whig presidential candidates, only Harrison was on the ballot in enough states for it to be mathematically possible for him to win a majority in the Electoral College, and even then, it would have required him to win Van Buren's home state of New York.

Anti-Masonic Party nomination 

After the negative views of Freemasonry among a large segment of the public began to wane in the mid 1830s, the Anti-Masonic Party began to disintegrate. Some of its members began moving to the Whig Party, which had a broader issue base than the Anti-Masons. The Whigs were also regarded as a better alternative to the Democrats.

A state convention for the Anti-Masonic Party was held in Harrisburg, Pennsylvania from December 14–17, 1835, to choose Presidential Electors for the 1836 election. The convention unanimously nominated William Henry Harrison for president and Francis Granger for vice president. The Vermont state Anti-Masonic convention followed suit on February 24, 1836. Anti-Masonic leaders were unable to obtain assurance from Harrison that he was not a Mason, so they called a national convention. The second national Anti-Masonic nominating convention was held in Philadelphia on May 4, 1836. The meeting was divisive, but a majority of the delegates officially stated that the party was not sponsoring a national ticket for the presidential election of 1836 and proposed a meeting in 1837 to discuss the future of the party.

Nullifier Party nomination 
The Nullifier Party had also begun to decline sharply since the previous election, after it became clear that the doctrine of nullification lacked sufficient support outside of the party's political base of South Carolina to ever make the Nullifiers more than a fringe party nationwide. Many party members began to drift towards the Democratic Party, but there was no question of the party endorsing Van Buren's bid for the presidency, as he and Calhoun were sworn enemies. Seeing little point in running their own ticket, Calhoun pushed the party into backing the White/Tyler ticket, as White had previously sided against Jackson during the Nullification Crisis.

General election

Campaign 

In the aftermath of the Nat Turner slave rebellion and other events, slavery emerged as an increasingly prominent political issue. Calhoun attacked Van Buren, saying that he could not be trusted to protect Southern interests and accusing the sitting Vice President of affiliating with abolitionists. Van Buren defeated Harrison by a margin of 51.4% to 48.6% in the North, and he defeated White by a similar margin of 50.7% to 49.3% in the South.

Disputes 

A dispute similar to that of Indiana in 1817 and Missouri in 1821 arose during the counting of the electoral votes. Michigan only became a state on January 26, 1837, and had cast its electoral votes for president before that date. Anticipating a challenge to the results, Congress resolved on February 4, 1837, that during the counting four days later the final tally was read twice, once with Michigan and once without Michigan. The counting proceeded in accordance with the resolution. The dispute had no bearing on the final result: either way Van Buren was elected, and either way no candidate had a majority for vice-president.

Results 
The Whigs' strategy narrowly failed to prevent Van Buren's election as president, though he earned a somewhat lower share of the popular vote and fewer electoral votes than Andrew Jackson had in either of the previous two elections.

The key state in this election was ultimately Pennsylvania, which Van Buren won from Harrison with a narrow majority of just 4,222 votes. Had Harrison won the state, Van Buren would have been left eight votes short of an Electoral College majority - despite receiving a majority (50.48%) in the popular vote - and the Whig goal to force the election into the House of Representatives (in accordance with the Twelfth Amendment to the United States Constitution) would have succeeded.

In a contingent election, the House would have been required to choose between Van Buren, Harrison, and White as the three candidates with the most electoral votes. Jacksonians controlled enough state delegations (14 out of 26) and enough Senate seats (31 out of 52) to win both the Presidency and the Vice-Presidency in a contingent election.

This was the last election in which the Democrats won Connecticut, Rhode Island, and North Carolina until 1852. This was also the only election where South Carolina voted for the Whigs, and the last time it voted against the Democrats until 1868. It was also the last time that a Democrat was elected to the U.S. presidency succeeding a Democrat who had served two terms as U.S. president.

Contingent election for Vice-President 
In an unusual turn of events, Virginia's 23 electors, who were all pledged to Van Buren and his running mate Richard Mentor Johnson, became faithless electors due to dissention related to Johnson's interracial relationship with a slave and refused to vote for Johnson, instead casting their vice-presidential votes for former South Carolina senator William Smith.

This left Johnson one electoral vote short of an Electoral College majority, forcing a contingent election in the Senate decided between the top two vote recipients, Johnson and Francis Granger. Since no vice presidential candidate received a majority of electoral votes, and for the only time in American history, the Senate decided a vice presidential race, selecting Democratic candidate Richard M. Johnson of Kentucky.

Source (Popular Vote): 
Source (Electoral Vote): 

(a) The popular vote figures exclude South Carolina where the electors were chosen by the state legislature rather than by popular vote.
(b) Mangum received his electoral votes from South Carolina where the electors were chosen by the state legislatures rather than by popular vote.

Source:

Geography of results

Cartographic gallery

Results by state
Source: Data from Walter Dean Burnham, Presidential ballots, 1836-1892 (Johns Hopkins University Press, 1955) pp 247–57.

Close states

States where the margin of victory was under 5%:
New Jersey 1.06% (545 votes)
Connecticut 1.3% (495 votes)
Pennsylvania 2.36% (4,222 votes) (tipping point state for a Van Buren victory)
Mississippi 2.56% (515 votes)
Louisiana 3.48% (259 votes)
Georgia 3.6% (1,703 votes)
Ohio 4.31% (8,720 votes)
Rhode Island 4.48% (254 votes)

States where the margin of victory was under 10%:
Kentucky 5.18% (3,632 votes)
North Carolina 6.2% (3,110 votes)
Delaware 6.54% (582 votes)
Maryland 7.46% (3,585 votes)
New York 9.26% (28,247 votes) (tipping point state for a Harrison victory)
Illinois 9.38% (3,149 votes)

Breakdown by ticket

1837 contingent election 

Since no candidate for vice president received a majority of the electoral votes, the U.S. Senate held a contingent election in which the top two electoral vote recipients, Richard Johnson and Francis Granger, were the candidates. On February 8, 1837, Johnson was elected on the first ballot by a vote of 33 to 16; the vote proceeded largely along party lines, albeit with three Whigs voting for Johnson, one Democrat voting for Granger, and three abstentions (Hugh L. White declined to vote out of respect for his own running-mate, John Tyler, while the two Nullifier Party senators refused to back either candidate). This is the only time that the Senate has exercised this power.

Electoral college selection

See also 

 Inauguration of Martin Van Buren
 History of the United States (1789–1849)
 1836–37 United States House of Representatives elections
 1836–37 United States Senate elections

References

Further reading

 Brown, Thomas. "The miscegenation of Richard Mentor Johnson as an issue in the national election campaign of 1835-1836." Civil War History 39.1 (1993): 5-30. online
 Cheathem, Mark. R. The Coming of Democracy: Presidential Campaigning in the Age of Jackson (Johns Hopkins University Press, 2018)
 Ershkowitz, Herbert B. "The Election of 1836." in American Presidential Campaigns and Elections;; (Routledge, 2020) pp. 270-288.
 Hoffmann, William S. "The Election of 1836 in North Carolina." North Carolina Historical Review 32.1 (1955): 31–51. online
 McCormick, Richard P. "Was There a" Whig Strategy" in 1836?." Journal of the Early Republic 4.1 (1984): 47-70. online
 Shade, William G.  "'The Most Delicate and Exciting Topics': Martin Van Buren, Slavery, and the Election of 1836." Journal of the Early Republic 18.3 (1998): 459-484 online.
 Silbey, Joel H. "Election of 1836," in Arthur M. Schlesinger, Jr. and Fred L. Israel, eds. History of American Presidential Elections (4 vols., 1971), I, 577–64, history plus primary sources
 Towers, Frank. "The Rise of the Whig Party." in A Companion to the Era of Andrew Jackson (2013): 328–347.

External links
 
 Presidential Election of 1836: A Resource Guide from the Library of Congress
 Election of 1836 in Counting the Votes 

 
Presidency of Martin Van Buren
Martin Van Buren
William Henry Harrison
John Tyler
November 1836 events
December 1836 events